The Shull House is a historic house at 418 Park Avenue in Lonoke, Arkansas.  It is a large -story building, its exterior clad in a combination of half-timbered stucco and brick.  The roof is tiled, with clipped gables and eaves that show exposed rafter ends in the American Craftsman style.  Windows are typically multipane casement windows in groups.  The house was built in 1918 to a design by Thompson and Harding.

The house was listed on the National Register of Historic Places in 1982.

See also
National Register of Historic Places listings in Lonoke County, Arkansas

References

Houses on the National Register of Historic Places in Arkansas
Houses completed in 1917
Houses in Lonoke County, Arkansas
National Register of Historic Places in Lonoke County, Arkansas
Buildings and structures in Lonoke, Arkansas